is a railway station located in the Tannocho neighbourhood of Kitami city in Hokkaidō, Japan, and services the Sekihoku Main Line operated by JR Hokkaido.

Station structure
The station is above ground and has two side platforms alongside two railway tracks. It is not permanently staffed.

Adjacent stations

History
October 5, 1912: Station opened.
Station unmanned since completion of CTC system.
February 1991: Station building renovated.

References

Railway stations in Hokkaido Prefecture
Railway stations in Japan opened in 1912